Christopher John Payne (born 30 December 1947) is a former English cricketer.  Payne was a right-handed batsman who occasionally fielded as a wicket-keeper.  He was born at Hatfield, Hertfordshire.

Payne made his first-class debut for Middlesex against Yorkshire in the 1968 County Championship.  He made four further first-class appearances for the county, the last of which came against Essex in the 1970 County Championship.  In his five first-class appearances, he scored a total of 40 runs at an average of 5.00, with a high score of 22.  He also two List A appearances for the county in the 1970 John Player League, against Derbyshire and Warwickshire, scoring a total of 28 runs.

Leaving Middlesex at the end of the 1970 season, he later played two matches for Hertfordshire in the 1974 Minor Counties Championship, against Bedfordshire and Suffolk.  The following season he played two List A matches for Minor Counties South against Kent and Essex, though without success.

References

External links
Christopher Payne at ESPNcricinfo
Christopher Payne at CricketArchive

1947 births
Living people
People from Hatfield, Hertfordshire
English cricketers
Middlesex cricketers
Hertfordshire cricketers
Minor Counties cricketers